Dave Mason Is Alive is an album of live recordings by Dave Mason.  Recorded in 1971 at the Troubadour club in Los Angeles, the album was released in 1973 by Blue Thumb Records.  It has been re-released by MCA Coral (MCA 713).

Background
As reported by William Ruhlmann of AllMusic, the album was released without Mason's approval.  Its release by Blue Thumb was prompted by the dispute between it and Mason, a dispute that started midway during the recording of Mason's previous album.  That previous album, Headkeeper, had been intended to be a double album, with one disk composed of live recordings made at the Troubador and the other of studio recordings. But after Mason ceased work and took possession of some of the studio masters, Blue Thumb released Headkeeper as a single album, one side live and one side studio recordings. As the dispute with Mason continued, Blue Thumb issued Dave Mason Is Alive, composed entirely of recordings from the same live performance that had been used for Headkeeper. Of the seven tracks on Alive, two of them, "Feelin' Alright" and "Just a Song", are repeated from Headkeeper.

Track listing
All tracks composed by Dave Mason, except where indicated.

Side one
 "Walk to the Point" - 4:15
 "Shouldn't Have Took More than You Gave" - 5:20
 "Look at You Look at Me" (Mason, Jim Capaldi) - 8:18

Side two
 "Only You Know and I Know" - 4:12
 "Sad and Deep as You" - 4:00
 "Just a Song" - 3:14
 "Feelin' Alright" - 5:54

Personnel
Dave Mason - electric and acoustic guitar, vocals
Felix Falcon aka "Flaco" - conga and percussion
"Dr." Rick Jaeger - drums
Mark Jordan - keyboards
Lonnie Turner - bass

Production
Produced by Tommy LiPuma and Dave Mason
Compiled by Tommy LiPuma
Recording and mixing engineer - Al Schmitt
Remote equipment by Wally Helder and crew - Miles Weiner, Terry Stark, Chris Chigaridas
Graphics and photography – Barry Feinstein, Camouflage Productions, Vicki Hodgetts
Photograph of Dave Mason - Jim Marshall

References 
The information under "Track listing", "Personnel" and "Production" was taken from the cover and labels of the 1973 release by Blue Thumb Records (BTS 54).

1973 albums
Dave Mason albums
Blue Thumb Records albums
Albums produced by Dave Mason
Albums produced by Tommy LiPuma